David Alan Coulier (born September 21, 1959) is an American actor, stand-up comedian, impressionist, and television host. He played Joey Gladstone on the ABC sitcom Full House, voiced Peter Venkman on The Real Ghostbusters, and voiced Animal and Bunsen on Muppet Babies.

Early life
David Alan Coulier was born on September 21, 1959, to David L. Coulier and Arlen Coulier in Detroit, Michigan, and was raised in nearby St. Clair Shores, Michigan. He has 3 siblings. His mother's side of the family is from Bathurst, New Brunswick, Canada, and his paternal grandmother was a Jewish immigrant from Germany. Coulier got his start in stand-up comedy in high school by impersonating his principal and other staff over his high school's PA system. He graduated in 1977 from Notre Dame High School in Harper Woods, Michigan, where he was a member of the varsity ice hockey team, playing defense alongside future NHL player John Blum.  Coulier also attended high school with Mark Cendrowski, who became friends with him in the third grade and they often made 8mm films together during high school. Coulier also attended The University of Michigan but dropped out after his freshman year to pursue comedy full time.

Career

Coulier met future Full House co-star Bob Saget for the first time at a comedy club in Detroit. The two became good friends and Coulier briefly lived with Saget and his then-wife Sherri on their couch in the early 1980s as he struggled to get his career started.

Coulier moved to Los Angeles at age 19 and started performing at the Comedy Shop in Los Angeles, where he performed alongside Jay Leno, David Letterman, Jerry Seinfeld, and Robin Williams.

Coulier was initially cast as a player for Saturday Night Live for its 1986 season. Shortly before the season started, however, he was left off the show because the show's management thought he was too similar to another cast member, Dana Carvey.

Coulier has done extensive voice work for shows including Scooby and Scrappy-Doo, The Real Ghostbusters, Slimer! and the Real Ghostbusters (taking over the character of Peter Venkman after Lorenzo Music's departure from the role), Extreme Ghostbusters, Muppet Babies after Howie Mandel left (Baby Animal, Baby Bunsen, Bean Bunny, and Uncle Statler and Waldorf, and a preteen Janice for one episode), The Jetsons, Rude Dog and the Dweebs, and Detention. From 1984 to 1985, he was also the host of a comedy series on Nickelodeon known as Out of Control.

Coulier is best known for playing Joey Gladstone on the ABC sitcom Full House. He stayed on the show from 1987 until its cancellation in 1995. He was famous for doing voices and impersonations. In addition to Full House, Coulier appeared on George and Leo and Nick Freno: Licensed Teacher. He has also hosted America's Funniest People (first with Arleen Sorkin and later with Tawny Kitaen) and Opportunity Knocks. Additionally, he was also a voice actor in Yogi Bear and the Magical Flight of the Spruce Goose and has voiced Felix the Cat on a few occasions. He also put out a solo album called Cut It Out, a self-proclaimed tribute to "tank tops and short shorts."

In addition to his voice work, Coulier has also taken a few acting parts, appearing in the Disney Channel Original Movie's The Thirteenth Year and The Even Stevens Movie (where he had a cameo as a reality show host), as well as the Nickelodeon original movie Shredderman Rules. He wrote and starred in an unaired pilot for FX called Whispers and Balls.

He also founded his own children's entertainment company, F3 Entertainment, in 2000. In 2003, Coulier appeared on season three of The Surreal Life. In 2006, he appeared on the TV reality show Skating with Celebrities on FOX, where he was paired with Olympic medalist Nancy Kerrigan. They were eliminated in episode four.

He is a member of Duck's Breath Mystery Theater touring comedy troupe (which he claims is clean comedy but "not quite as creepy" as Full House) as well as the host of the series Animal Kidding.

On June 2, 2008, Chikara, a professional wrestling promotion based in Philadelphia, Pennsylvania, announced that Coulier was elected by the Chikara Board of Directors as the new commissioner of the company, a position that he held for two years until the next election (which took place on May 25, 2010). Coulier is the successor to former Commissioner and fellow Full House cast member Bob Saget.

In 2009, Coulier provided the voice for Bob McKenzie on the Canadian animated series Bob & Doug, based on the SCTV characters Bob and Doug McKenzie. Coulier became the first person other than Rick Moranis to portray the character, as Moranis (who serves as executive producer) was not interested in resuming the part. Coulier says he understands that longtime fans might be skeptical of his take on the role, but he could not help jumping at the chance to portray one of his favorite comic characters. "It's huge shoes to fill, stepping into Rick Moranis' shoes. It's such an established, great character and I guess the only thing I have going for me is that it kind of sounds alike and that half of my family is from Canada." His mother's family is from Bathurst, New Brunswick.

Coulier continued to make regular television appearances as the host of shows such as America's Funniest People and America's Most Talented Kid. He continues to tour the U.S. and Canada as a stand-up comedian.

Coulier reprised his role as Joey Gladstone for the Full House spin-off Fuller House.

Personal life
In the early 1990s, Coulier was married for two years to Jayne Modean. They have a son, Luc, born in 1990. Having divorced, he started dating Alanis Morissette, but they broke up shortly before she recorded her album Jagged Little Pill. He was rumored to be the subject of Morissette's song "You Oughta Know" and in a 2008 interview with the Calgary Herald, Coulier indicated he thinks the rumor is true. However, in the 2021 documentary Jagged, Morissette denied the song is about Coulier. In 2005, Coulier began dating photographer and producer Melissa Bring. They married on July 2, 2014, in Montana.

Coulier is a private pilot who owns and flies a B35 Bonanza. His first general aviation flight was at the age of five in Michigan. He earned his pilot's license at the same airport later in 1979 and is now instrument rated. In 2012, he did more flight training in a Cirrus SR20 to "keep current." He is part of the Hat in the Ring Society to support the AOPA foundation, an organization that promotes safe flying.

Coulier is an ice hockey fan and participates in charity events with the Detroit Red Wings. He is also a fan of the Detroit Tigers and has played in celebrity softball games alongside Detroit Tigers fan Tom Selleck.

In popular culture

The Same Picture... blog
The Same Picture of Dave Coulier Every Day is an image blog which publishes the same photograph of Coulier every day.  Begun in 2011 by comedian Aaron Littleton, it is the progenitor of a trend of similarly themed blogs which feature the same content in every daily update.  The trend of such "content homogeneity" has been studied in academic literature.  The trend has also been called "single-topic", and Forbes has called The Same Picture of Dave Coulier Every Day the apotheosis of the movement.

Reception 
Media coverage has attributed the blog's unchanging nature as reason for its popularity.  BBC Trending featured the blog and said "It could be that in the constant chaos of social media, perhaps what sometimes people really need is just the same thing over and over again." The AV Club commented on the blog saying: "A port in a storm, The Same Picture Of Dave Coulier Every Day tumblr is perhaps the only consistent thing left in this tumultuous world." The Toronto Standard said, "In a world pervaded with financial uncertainty and intractable conflict, a little consistency is surely warranted, and an anonymous philanthropist has given us just that in blog form."

Other outlets have noted the inherent humor of the blog. In reference to blog, the Mary Sue commented, "Either Tumblr must be crowned King of the Comedy-Based Internet, or it must be stopped. It is difficult to tell which is the better option." The book Geek Lust says, "how long can this madness continue?"

Filmography

Film

Television

References

External links

cleanguys.TV

1959 births
Living people
American aviators
American impressionists (entertainers)
American male comedians
American male film actors
American male television actors
American male voice actors
American people of French-Canadian descent
American people of German-Jewish descent
American stand-up comedians
Male actors from Michigan
People from St. Clair Shores, Michigan
University of Michigan alumni
20th-century American comedians
21st-century American comedians
20th-century American male actors
21st-century American male actors